Shazli Hafeez Khan, better known as Shaz Khan is a Pakistani-American actor and director who appears in English and Urdu films, and television series. After pursuing a bachelor's degree in finance from the Pennsylvania State University and a master's degree in fine arts from the Pace University, Khan made his acting debut with the acclaimed drama Moor (2015) and received praise for playing the role of a lawyer in the television series Yaqeen Ka Safar (2017), and a pilot in the combat war film Parwaaz Hai Junoon (2018).

Life and career 
Khan was born in Oxnard, California to Muslim parents, Nasir and Huma, from Islamabad, Pakistan. He belongs to a military family: his grandfather was an air commodore in the Pakistan Air Force, while his uncle is also an air commodore and "one of the top F16 pilots of his generation." He spent his childhood between Pakistan and the United States, eventually settling in the suburbs of Philadelphia. After high school, Khan ended up attending Pennsylvania State University, where he also boxed for the college team, completing a Bachelor of Science in finance. He worked for a Fortune 500 company in the banking industry, though it would only last a few years. Khan ultimately left his stable job to pursue acting in New York City.

The next few years were spent attending the Actors Studio Drama School at Pace University, completing a Master of Fine Arts in acting. During this time, he worked in numerous plays and independent films, building his experience. Khan established a reputation for doing whatever it took to immerse himself in a character. For his thesis play Hello Out There, he drove to a ghost town in Texas to do research, sleeping overnight in the haunted jail by himself. For the short film Flutter, Khan spent a month getting into the physiological state to play a young cancer patient, including losing 25 pounds and shaving his head and eyebrows. He also ventured into some experimental work by making his own series of short films, writing characters for himself while he was auditioning for roles. Among them was a young sadistic Oscar Wilde in Importance of Earnest as well as a deluded boxer Ibby in Say It Ain't So.

Even though he made his Pakistan TV debut in Mehreen Jabbar's 2012 drama Mata-e-Jaan Hai Tu with the little role of lawyer Vicky, followed by another minor role as David in Momina Duraid's Zid, his break occurred on a trip to Pakistan where he secured the lead role in the international feature film Moor, directed by Jami. He spent a month in a village in Balochistan, observing the behaviors of local Pashtuns to find the physicality of his character, and learning to speak Urdu in their dialect. The film was hailed as one of the most critically acclaimed features in Pakistan, with Newsline Magazine claiming it as one of the best films Pakistan has ever made. The film was selected as the Pakistani entry for the Best Foreign Language Film at the 88th Academy Awards. It was in contention as one of the dark horse contenders but didn't receive a nomination. He shared the screen with established actors Hameed Sheikh and Samiyah Mumtaz. It was his debut in the Pakistani film industry.

In 2016 he appeared in the romantic drama Dobara Phir Se directed by Mehreen Jabbar and produced by ARY Films followed by Haseeb Hassan's Parwaaz Hai Junoon in 2018, both being critical as well as commercial successes, in-between having a substantial role in the 2017 Hum TV drama Yaqeen Ka Safar. He returned to the channel in 2018, with the leading role in the drama Lamhay.

His upcoming movie, for which he wrote the script, is entitled The Martial Artist, the story of "a desi martial artist who fights in California... and eventually ends up coming back to Pakistan", an enlargement of his 2016 short film Say It Ain't So, that he also wrote, as well as directed, produced, edited and acted in. In order to prepare for the role, he trained in MMA with the Brazilian coach Rafael Cordeiro, "one of the best MMA coaches in the world" who "has trained 13 world champions and trains fighters from Ultimate Fighting Championship", while also being trained in boxing, Jujutsu and Muay Thai.

Personal life 
Khan resides with his wife, Saba Khan, since their marriage in 2012, in California, and she gave birth to their child,a son, named Aayan, in January 2020.

Filmography

Films

Television

References

External links 
 
 
 

Living people
Smeal College of Business alumni
Pace University alumni
American male actors
American people of Pakistani descent
Pakistani film actors
Year of birth missing (living people)